Enscepastra cygnica is a moth of the family Coleophoridae. It was described by Wolfram Mey in 2011. It is found in South Africa, where it has been recorded from the Western Cape.

References

Coleophoridae
Moths described in 2011